Ronald Oldham Doig (10 July 1909 – 17 September 1932) was an Australian sportsman who played Australian rules football for South Fremantle in the West Australian Football League (WAFL) and first-class cricket with Western Australia.

A member of the famous Doig family of Fremantle, Ron was a first cousin of George Doig. He made his debut for South Fremantle at the age of just 17 in 1927 and by 1930 was representing Western Australia at interstate football. He was captain of South Fremantle in 1931 and captain-coach in 1932.

On the cricket field, Doig was a right-arm fast-medium bowler and right-handed batsman. He made three first-class cricket appearances for Western Australia, the first of which came in 1926/27 against South Australia. Doig did not bowl and instead played as a top order batsman, making scores of eight and five.

He had to wait until 1931 to play again at first-class level, with his opportunity coming when South Africa toured. Batting at four, he failed to impress with the bat but took what would be the only wicket of his first-class career, bowling opener Herbie Taylor. When South Africa returned to Perth five months later, Doig made his only other first-class appearance but he did not affect the game.

In the finals of the 1932 WANFL season, Doig, who was now captain-coach of South Fremantle, was injured during a match against East Perth. He died from his injuries later that night after suffering from convulsions. The coroner investigated the death and declared it was an accidental death, but was critical of the lack of control by the umpire, the roughness of the play and the fact that the medical staff did not have the right to order players from the field.

References

External links

George Doig website

1909 births
1932 deaths
South Fremantle Football Club players
South Fremantle Football Club coaches
Australian cricketers
Western Australia cricketers
Australian rules footballers from Fremantle
Australian people of Scottish descent
Cricketers from Fremantle
Ron Sr.
Sport deaths in Australia
Accidental deaths in Western Australia